Lebanon is census-designated place (CDP) and unincorporated community in Marshall County, Oklahoma, United States.  It has a post office with the ZIP code 73440.

History
Lebanon was settled in the late 19th century as part of the  Chickasaw Indian Nation and was part of Pickens County.  A Chickasaw Tribal Courthouse was located in Lebanon.  About a mile to the east of Hauani Creek is the remains of the Burney School, a tribal school operated by the Chickasaws.

Geography
Lebanon is located on the western end of Lake Texoma, near where the Red River and Hauani Creek enters the lake at  (33.982222, -96.9075).

Demographics

As of the census of 2000, the population of the ZCTA for ZIP Code 73440 was 327.

Economy
Lebanon is primarily a farming area. There is one dollar general and gas station, and a few other small businesses.

Transportation
Lebanon is served by State Highway 32 and other local roads.

References

Census-designated places in Oklahoma
Census-designated places in Marshall County, Oklahoma
Unincorporated communities in Oklahoma
Unincorporated communities in Marshall County, Oklahoma